Netball Australian Capital Territory is the governing body for netball in the Australian Capital Territory. It is affiliated to Netball Australia. It is responsible for organizing and managing the association's representative teams including Capital Darters, who compete in the Australian Netball Championships and The Capital Spirit, who compete in Netball NSW Premier League. It is also responsible for organizing and managing the HCF State League as well as other leagues and competitions for junior and youth teams. Its headquarters are based at the SolarHub ACT Netball Centre in Lyneham, Australian Capital Territory. It was originally founded in the early 1940s as the ACT Women's Basketball Association and was initially affiliated to the New South Wales Women's Basketball Association. In 1975 it became affiliated directly to the All Australia Netball Association.

History
Netball ACT was originally founded in the early 1940s as the ACT Women's Basketball Association. While netball was played earlier than this in the Australian Capital Territory, mainly between school teams, this was the first formal association. It was
initially affiliated to the New South Wales Women's Basketball Association. 1970 saw the creation of the Canberra Netball Association and the South Canberra Netball Association to accommodate increasing participation and the growing number of players. In 1975 the ACT Netball Association became affiliated directly to the All Australia Netball Association. This move was supported by Netball New South Wales and required a change to the national governing body's constitution, allowing territories to be admitted.  

Since 1990, the headquarters of Netball ACT have been located at the Solarhub Netball Centre, in Lyneham, Australian Capital Territory.

Representative teams

Current

Former

Competitions
 HCF State League
 Capital Chemist Junior Championships 
 Social Competitions

Member associations

Netball ACT board 
President

CEO

References

External links
   Netball ACT on Facebook

 
Australian Capital Territory
Netball